The Main Building of the University of Santo Tomas (UST) in Manila, Philippines functions as the university's administrative center, and home of the Faculty of Civil Law, Faculty of Pharmacy, and the College of Science. The Main Building is also the home of the Museum of Arts and Sciences.

Building
The building, designed by Fr. Roque Ruaño, O.P., is the first earthquake-resistant building in the Philippines. Ruaño was influenced by Frank Lloyd Wright's Imperial Hotel, Tokyo.

Design and structure
 

In 1920, Roque Ruaño was assigned to draw up plans for the UST Main Building to be constructed at the Sulucan property of the Dominican Order. During the years 1922 and 1923, the plans were finally completed. However, some fine tunings may have been made on the design criteria as a result of the new lessons learned from the Great Kantō earthquake of September 1, 1923 which flattened Tokyo and Yokohama. Eventually, construction began in 1924.

The structure is a rectangular building having a dimension of 86 meters long and 74 meters wide with two interior courtyards or patios. The most significant feature is the fact that it is actually made up of 40 separate structures independent from one another with the only opportunity provided by pre-cast stab flooring. But some locations of the separations are now difficult to determine exactly because of the numerous cosmetic changes the interior of the building which has undergone over the years. According to an article written by the former dean of Faculty of Engineering, Manuel Mañosa, this is how it is divided:

 four corner units
 two midsection units (rear and front entrance)
 one tower (including two elevator cores)
 one entrance canopy
 a total of 26 units
 seven units for P. Noval side
 seven units for Gov. Forbes (now Arsenio H. Lacson) side
 six units for Dapitan side
 six units for España side
 four middle section (or paraninfo)
 two stair section adjacent to tower and elevator core

Statues

Standing on the pedestals of the fourth floor of the building are statues symbolizing the spiritual and intellectual aspiration of the university. Designed by the Italian Francesco Monti, faculty member of the College of Architecture, they were installed between 1949 and 1953.

 Surrounding the clock, the so-called "Tria Haec" are three statues representing, from left to right:
 Hope (Spe)
 Faith (Fides) (on top of the clock)
 Love (Caritas) 
 To the right of the Tria Haec are theologians and historians:
 Saint Augustine
 Raymond of Peñafort, O.P.
 Vincent of Beauvais, O.P
 To the right of the theologians and historians, facing Padre Noval Street are the tragedians:
 Pedro Calderón de la Barca
 Sophocles
 William Shakespeare
 To the left of the Tria Haec are the philosophers:
 Aristotle
 Saint Albert the Great
 Plato
 To the left of the philosophers and facing Arsenio Lacson Avenue are the playwrights:
 Lope de Vega
 Aristophanes
 Molière

History

Construction began on 1924 and first classes were held on July 2, 1927. The faculties of Philosophy and Letters, Liberal Arts (they would later merge under the Philosophy and Letters name, later to be renamed as the Faculty of Arts and Letters), Faculties of Medicine and Pharmacy, Faculty of Engineering, and the College of Education were the first occupants who transferred to the new building. Since then, the Main Building has been the focal point of the campus. It is where all succeeding structures revolved.

After the invasion and occupation of the Philippines by the Japanese during World War II, the Japanese converted the university into the Santo Tomas Internment Camp for Americans and other non-Filipinos starting on January 4, 1942. Three floors of the building were occupied by the internees. Several internees were located in the Education Building (now housing the University of Santo Tomas Hospital) and other buildings.

On February 3, 1945, during the Battle for Manila the university was liberated by the 1st Cavalry Division, tanks from the 44th Tank Battalion and Filipino guerrillas. On February 4, Japanese commander Toshio Hayashi took some of the internees hostage in the nearby Education Building and negotiated for the Japanese soldiers to rejoin Japanese forces in the south of the city in exchange for the internees. A plaque dedicated in 1954 commemorates the event.

After the war, UST resumed operation, holding classes in the building. The university and the building was visited by Pope Paul VI in 1970 and Pope John Paul II in 1995 when UST hosted World Youth Day 1995. In 2015, Pope Francis became the third pope to visit the university, but did not enter the building.

Aside from Popes, several notable international figures have visited the building. In 2012, Queen Sofia of Spain visited the building.

Gallery

See also
 List of University of Santo Tomas buildings

References

External links

University of Santo Tomas
Buildings and structures in Sampaloc, Manila
Educational structures in Metro Manila
University and college buildings completed in 1927
Cultural Properties of the Philippines in Metro Manila
National Cultural Treasures of the Philippines
1927 establishments in the Philippines
Beaux-Arts architecture
Renaissance Revival architecture
20th-century religious buildings and structures in the Philippines